Police Helmet may mean the following:
 Custodian helmet as worn by British and other police forces
 Crash helmets
 Helmet camera
 Riot protection helmet

Helmets
Law enforcement equipment